Mammoth is a census-designated place in Park County, Wyoming, United States, comprising Fort Yellowstone and Mammoth Hot Springs in Yellowstone National Park. As of the 2010 census, its population was 263.

Some students from Mammoth attend Gardiner Public Schools in Gardiner, Montana.

Climate

See also
 Mammoth Hot Springs Historic District

References

Census-designated places in Park County, Wyoming
Census-designated places in Wyoming
Yellowstone National Park